Giovanni Fontana (1644 – 2 March 1716) was a Roman Catholic prelate who served as Bishop of Cesena (1697–1716).

Biography
Giovanni Fontana was born in Modigliana, Italy in 1644. On 3 June 1697, he was appointed during the papacy of Pope Clement VIII as Bishop of Cesena. On 9 June 1697, he was consecrated bishop by Bandino Panciatici, Cardinal-Priest of San Pancrazio, with Miguel Antonio de Benavides y Piedrola, Bishop of Cartagena, and Alessandro Lambert, Bishop of Aosta, serving as co-consecrators. He served as Bishop of Cesena until his death on 2 March 1716.

References

External links and additional sources
 (for Chronology of Bishops) 
 (for Chronology of Bishops) 

17th-century Italian Roman Catholic bishops
18th-century Italian Roman Catholic bishops
Bishops appointed by Pope Clement VIII
1644 births
1716 deaths